The 2016 Emir of Qatar Cup was the 44th edition of the cup tournament in men's football. It is played by the 1st and 2nd level divisions of the Qatari football league structure.

The competition features all teams from the 2015–16 Qatar Stars League and the top four sides from the Qatargas League. Four venues are to be used – Al Sadd Stadium, Al Arabi Stadium,  Qatar SC Stadium and Khalifa Stadium.

The cup winner is guaranteed a place in the 2017 AFC Champions League.

Round One
Al Mu'aidar (P) 0-0 Al Shahaniya

Al Markhiya 1-3 Al Shamal

Round Two
Al Kharitiyath 1-0 Qatar SC

Al Wakrah (P) 0-0 Al Shamal

Al Gharafa 1-0 Al Mu'aidar

Al Khor 2-1 Al Mesaimeer

Round Three
Al Wakrah 1-2 Al Sailiya

Al Kharitiyath (P) 2-2 Al Arabi

Al Khor 2-3 Al Ahli

Al Gharafa (P) 1-1 Umm Salal

Quarter-finals
Al Kharitiyath 0-3 Al Rayyan

Al Gharafa 2-3 Al Sadd

Al Sailiya 0-1 Lekhwiya

Al Ahli 2-4 El Jaish

Semi-finals
Al Rayyan 2-3 Al Sadd

Lekhwiya 2-1 El Jaish

Final
Al Sadd 2-2 Lekhwiya  (aet, 2–4 pens)

References

External links
2016 Emir Cup, Soccerway.com

Football competitions in Qatar
Football cup competitions in Qatar